Gelasius Ó Cuileanáin (or Glaisne O'Cullenan) was a Cistercian Abbot of Boyle, Ireland and one of the Irish Catholic Martyrs.

Biography
He was born probably near Assaroe Abbey, at Ballyshannon, County Donegal; martyred, 21 November 1580. Three of his brothers were Cistercian abbots, and a fourth Bishop of Raphoe.
 
Gelasius, the eldest, studied at Salamanca University in Spain, went thence to Paris where he took his doctorate at the Sorbonne, made his monastic profession, and was created Abbot of Boyle, County Roscommon.
 
This abbey had been confiscated and granted to Cusack, Sheriff of Meath; but the Irish regulars continued to appoint superiors to the suppressed houses. The young abbot went immediately to Ireland and is said to have obtained restoration of his abbey. He was, however, seized at Dublin by the Government and imprisoned with Eugene O'Mulkeeran, Abbot of Holy Trinity at Lough Key. Refusing to conform, they were tortured and finally hanged outside Dublin, 21 November 1580. O'Cullenan's body was spared mutilation through his friends' intercession. His clothes were divided as a martyr's relics among the Catholics.

Sources

16th-century Irish abbots
1580 deaths
University of Salamanca alumni
University of Paris alumni
Irish Cistercians
16th-century Irish Roman Catholic priests
16th-century Roman Catholic martyrs
People from Ballyshannon
People from County Donegal
People executed by the Kingdom of Ireland by hanging
Irish expatriates in Spain
Irish expatriates in France
Year of birth unknown
Executed Irish people